Central is a department in Paraguay. The capital is Areguá. With 2,243,792 inhabitants, it is the most populated and the smallest of the 17 departments of Paraguay.

Boundaries
North: the departments of Cordillera and Presidente Hayes
West: the Argentine province of Formosa separated by the Paraguay River, and the capital district, Asunción.
East: the department of Paraguarí
South: the department of Ñeembucú

Districts
The department is divided in 19 districts:

Geography

The mountainous area of Altos and the bodies of water such as the Paraguay and the Salado rivers, the lakes Ypacaraí and Ypoá, and the pond Cabral are part of the natural limits in Central. These along with other regions in the south section generate a good potential of resources for the diverse activities such as tourism and even agriculture.

Education

Paraguay’s Central Department (a “department” is similar to a state or province in other countries) enjoys one of the nation’s highest enrollment rates (84%) for elementary and secondary education for children and youth from age 7 through age 18. More boys are enrolled compared to girls, by a margin of 6%. More students attend public schools (69.9%) compared to private schools (30.1%). The Central Department has around 750 elementary education institutions and close to 350 secondary education institutions. The city of San Lorenzo is home to two important educational institutions: the state-run Universidad Nacional de Asunción and the Regional Education Center Saturio Rios, which includes a teacher training college, secondary school, and primary schools that serve as “lab schools.”

Climate

The maximum temperatures are in the summer, reaching the 40 °C, which sometimes can be even higher. In the winter, the minimum temperature is 0 °C. The annual average temperature is 22 °C. Rains vary approximately 1433 mm per year. The period between the months of January and February is the rainiest, and the driest period is during the months of June and August.

Hydrology

The department is mainly watered by the Paraguay River and its affluents: the Salado River, which is flowed by the Ypacaraí Lake and the streams Itay, Paray e Ytororó.
The streams Yuquyry and Ñanduá drain into the Ypoá wetlands.
The lakes Ypacaraí, Ypoá and the lagoon Cabral are situated in this region of the country.

Orography

The spurs of the Ybytypanema, part of the los Altos chain, are in this department. Its highest hills are Lambaré, Ñanduá and Arrua-í.
Other lower hills in the zone are the Ñemby and the Patiño.

History

The Central Department, known as “Comarca Asuncena”, was the most populated region in the country in old times.
In the times of the conquest and colonization, this region had already been the center from where new foundations were expanded, as well as it was the settlers’ refuge who were escaping from the attacks of the Guaicurú Indians.

The towns in this department have had various origins. One of the main protagonists of these foundations was Domingo Martínez de Irala, who gave rise to the districts of Itá and Areguá. The town of Luque was established as a Spanish village. Villeta and Tapuá, nowadays called Mariano Roque Alonso were founded in order to establish military forts for defence.

Others tows like Capiatá and Itauguá were expanded around chapels used as evangelization centers, The towns in the department are bound, partly, due to the chaqueños Indians’ resistance against the Spanish conquest of their lands, which forced the settlers to emigrate and take refuge in this part of the region. That was how were established villages like Guarambaré, Ypané and Ñemby.

A different origin had the towns of Nueva Italia, Colonia Thompson and Villa Elisa, already established as agricultural colonies back in the 19th century and beginnings of the XX, and mainly settled by foreign immigrants.
By 1985, the last district in the Central Department, Juan Augusto Saldívar, had been established.

Transportation

Routes
By being part of the metropolitan area of the country's capital, this department is favored by having a lot of routes. Most of the routes of the country leave from Asunción to the country towns.
National route PY01 links the capital city with southern Paraguay; PY02 does with eastern Paraguay, which borders Brazil; PY03 connects this metro area with the northern departments, while PY19 connects it with western Ñeembucú mainly.

Airports
Paraguay's main airport, the Silvio Pettirossi International Airport, is located in Central, specifically in the city of Luque.

Economy

Of the 3049 industrial plants in the Paraguayan territory, 1,558 are found in this department. The industrial production includes the processing of food, furniture, clothing, pharmaceutical production, metallurgic, plastic and ceramics. The city of Villeta is home to a large number of industries. Central is the second biggest economy of Paraguay, and occupies the second place in attraction of inversions from other countries. Only 62% of the population is considered economically active.

Waterway

The waterways in the Central Department are determined by the “Río Paraguay”, with its main affluents being those of Asunción and Villeta.

Airports

Its main airport is the Silvio Pettirossi International Airport, located in the town of Luque. This station links the department with the rest of the country and abroad.

Communications

There are a lot of AM radio stations. Some of them are Radio Cardinal, Radio Ñandutí, 
Radio Nanawa and Radio Libre. Frequency modulation transmitters are as follows: 1º de Marzo, Ñemby, Cardinal, Disney, Amor, Luque, Itaguá, Lambaré, Trinidad, San Lorenzo, Azul y Oro, Guarania, among others.
There are also numerous television channels and cable transmission services.

In Areguá, located on the banks of the Lago Ypacaraí is situated the Satellite Station
The Central Department has telephone exchanges capable of communicating with all the districts.

Health

The department has numerous places where residents can receive health care, such as hospitals, health posts, and centers. The private sector takes part in this area as well, offering health services in every district of the department.

Tourist attractions

The Central Department has a large number of attractions for tourism. Among the most famous natural resources at an international level, is the Lago Ypacaraí, which is represented in the immortal play of Demetrio Ortíz, the beautiful guarania. This lake is a very important natural attraction, and the town of Areguá, the department's capital, is located on the banks of this lake.

There is a great variety of Museums, historical places and cultural centers in the districts.
It can be seen parks and green places preserved for the practice of outdoors sports.
The hotel industry is an important source of income for this department.  Each district has its patronal feasts and celebrations which are part of the people culture.

References

 Geografía del Paraguay - Editorial Hispana Paraguay S.R.L.- 1a. Edición 1999 - Asunción Paraguay
 Geografía Ilustrada del Paraguay -  - Distribuidora Arami S.R.L.
 La Magia de nuestra tierra. Fundación en Alianza. Asunción. 2007.

External links

 Central Info (in Spanish)
  SENATUR